YARA is the name of a tool primarily used in malware research and detection.

It provides a rule-based approach to create descriptions of malware families based on regular expression, textual or binary patterns. A description is essentially a YARA rule name, where these rules consist of sets of strings and a boolean expression.

History 
YARA was originally developed by Victor Alvarez of VirusTotal, and released on GitHub in 2013. The name is either an abbreviation of YARA: Another Recursive Acronym, or Yet Another Ridiculous Acronym.

Design 

YARA by default comes with modules to process PE, ELF analysis, as well as support for the open-source Cuckoo sandbox.

See also 

 Sigma
 Snort

References

External links 
 
 YARA documentation

Computer forensics